Sarı Saltık (also spelled Sarı Saltuk, "the blonde", ; also referred as Sari Saltuk Baba or Dede) (died 1297/98) was a 13th-century Alevi Turkish dervish, venerated as a saint by the Bektashi Sufi Muslims in the Balkans and parts of Middle East as well as the mainstream Sunni Muslim community.

Historical figure
According to 14th-century Moroccan traveller Ibn Battuta, Saltik was an "ecstatic devotee", although "things are told of him that are reproved by the Divine Law". He is considered by various sources a disciple of Mahmud Hayran, of Haji Bektash Veli, or of one of the successors of Ahmed ar-Rifa'i. According to the 17th-century traveller Evliya Çelebi, his real name was Mehmed, and he was from Bukhara. Early 20th-century historian Frederick Hasluck considered him a saint of a Tatar tribe from Crimea, which had brought his cult into Dobruja, from where it was spread by the Bektashis.

According to the 15th-century Oghuzname narrative, in 1261 he accompanied a group of Anatolia Turkomans into Dobruja, where they were settled by the Byzantine Emperor Michael VIII  to protect the northern frontier of the empire. However, Dobruja was occupied by Tatars in the same period. The same source places him in Crimea after 1265, along the Turkomans transferred there by Tatar khan Berke, and after 1280 mentions him leading the nomads back to Dobruja. After the death of Sari Saltik, some of the Turkomans returned to Anatolia, while other remained and became Christians, becoming the ancestors of the Gagauz people. This migration has characteristics of a folk epic destan, and its historicity is doubted by some scholars.

Legacy in Babadag
The town of Babadag (Turkish, Babadağ, Mountain of the Baba), in the Romanian Dobruja, identified with the town of Baba Saltuq visited in 1331/1332 by Ibn Battuta, is said to be named after him. The oldest sources about Sari Saltik available place his tomb in the area of the future town. This tomb was visited in 1484/1485 by Ottoman Sultan Bayezid II during a military campaign, and, after reporting an important victory, he ordered the building of a religious and educational complex here (including a mausoleum to Saltik, finished in 1488), around which the town developed. According to Evliya Çelebi, a marble sarcophagus was found during the construction, with a Tatar inscription attesting it was the tomb of the saint. However this miraculous discovery is not mentioned in other sources talking about the sultan's passage through the town.

Babadag became an important place of pilgrimage, visited in 1538 by Suleiman the Magnificent, and the most important urban centre in 16th-century Dobruja. The town however decayed during the frequent wars that ravaged the region during the 17th century, and was eventually burned down, along with the mausoleum to Saltik, during the Russo-Turkish Wars. A simple domed türbe was rebuilt over the grave of the saint in 1828. The mausoleum in Babadag remains of relative importance even nowadays, and was recently renovated, being reinaugurated in 2007 by the then-Turkish prime-minister Recep Tayyip Erdoğan.

Legendary figure
In various Orthodox Christian legends, he is identified with saints such as Saint George, Elijah, Saint Nicholas, Saint Simeon, Saint Naum or Saint Spyridon. According to a local legend, his body was buried in seven coffins, in remote towns and villages within the lands of the Infidels. Nowadays, alleged tombs (türbe) of his, are found all over the Balkans (Blagaj, Mostar, Krujë, Kaliakra) and western Anatolia (İznik).

Notes

References

External links
Sari Saltik in Albania

Sufi saints from the Ottoman Empire
1290s deaths
Year of birth unknown
13th-century people from the Ottoman Empire
History of Dobruja